Syeda Nosheen Iftikhar() is a Pakistani politician who is a Member of the National Assembly of Pakistan since April 2021. She won the by-elections from constituency  NA-75 (Sialkot-IV).۔

Personal life 
Nausheen Iftikhar is a daughter of ex-Member of National Assembly of Pakistan Syed Iftikhar Ul Hassan. Her ex-husband Sahabzada Syed Murtaza Amin ex-Member of National Assembly of Pakistan is a religious leader of Allo Mahar and current president of spiritual naqshbandi chain of Islam with millions of followers not only in Pakistan but also in other countries.Her son Syed Imam Murtaza is next in row to preside Naqshbandi chain of saints of Allo Mahar and to carry on political legacy of this religious and political family of Allo Mahar.

Political career 
She contested by-elections held on 10 April 2021 from constituency NA-75 (Sialkot-IV). She defeated PTI candidate Ali Asjad Malhi. She secured 110,075 votes, whereas Ali Asjad Malhi obtains 93,433 votes.

References

Pakistani MNAs 2018–2023
Living people
Year of birth missing (living people)
People from Sialkot District
Pakistan Muslim League (N) MNAs